Ajay Dubé (born 10 October 1960 in Paris) is a Canadian former field hockey player who competed in the 1988 Summer Olympics.

He was inducted into the Lisgar Collegiate Institute Athletic Wall of Fame in 2018.

References

External links
 

1960 births
Living people
Canadian male field hockey players
Olympic field hockey players of Canada
Field hockey players at the 1988 Summer Olympics
Pan American Games gold medalists for Canada
Field hockey players at the 1987 Pan American Games
Field hockey players from Paris
French emigrants to Canada
Canadian sportspeople of Indian descent
Pan American Games medalists in field hockey
Lisgar Collegiate Institute alumni
Medalists at the 1987 Pan American Games